The Power Mac G4 is a series of personal computers designed, manufactured, and sold by Apple Computer from 1999 to 2004 as part of the Power Macintosh line.  Built around the PowerPC G4 series of microprocessors, the Power Mac G4 was marketed by Apple as the first "personal supercomputers", reaching speeds of 4 to 20 gigaFLOPS. This was the first existing Macintosh product to be officially shortened as "Mac", and is the last Mac able to boot into classic Mac OS.

The enclosure style introduced with the Power Macintosh G3 (Blue and White) was retained through the entire five-year production run of the Power Mac G4, albeit with significant changes to match Apple's evolving industrial design and to accommodate increasing cooling needs.  The G4 and its enclosure were retired with the introduction of the Power Mac G5.

1st generation: Graphite 

The original Power Mac G4 was introduced at the Seybold conference in San Francisco on August 31, 1999. The PCI Graphics model was the last to use the full name of Power Macintosh. Colloquially, this first generation of Power Mac G4 is referred to as "Graphite". This is due to the color scheme of the case, which officially debuted with the Power Mac G4 (predating the graphite iMac DV Special Edition by 2 months).

Apple originally planned to ship the  configuration in October 1999, but they were forced to postpone this because of poor yield of the CPUs.

The early  (later ) PCI-based version used a motherboard identical to the one used in Power Macintosh G3 (Blue and White) computers including the use of Zero Insertion Force (ZIF) processors sockets (minus the ADB port), in a "graphite" colored case and with the new Motorola PowerPC 7400 (G4) CPU. The higher-speed models, code name "Sawtooth", used a greatly modified motherboard design with AGP 2x graphics (replacing the  PCI slot).

The PCI variant was discontinued at the end of 1999.

The machines featured DVD-ROM drives as standard. The  and  versions had  Zip drives as standard equipment, and as an option on the  Sawtooth. The AGP Power Macs were the first to include an AirPort slot and DVI video port. The computers could house a total of three hard drives, two 128 GB ATA hard drives and up to a single 20 GB SCSI hard drive, with the installation of a SCSI card.

DVD-RAM and Zip drives featured on these later  and  versions and were an option on the 400 MHz.

The Power Mac G4 (Gigabit Ethernet) model was introduced at Macworld Expo New York on July 19, 2000; the new revision included dual-processor  and  versions, and a low-end single CPU  model. It was also the first personal computer to include gigabit Ethernet as standard. The dual  models featured DVD-RAM optical drives. Zip drives were optional on all models. These models also introduced Apple's proprietary Apple Display Connector video port.

Graphite model variations 

All are obsolete.

2nd generation: Digital Audio/Quicksilver 

A new line with a revamped motherboard but retaining the familiar "Graphite" case debuted on January 9, 2001. Known officially as the Power Mac G4 (Digital Audio), it is in effect a Quicksilver design inside the Graphite enclosure. Motorola had added a seventh pipeline stage in the new PowerPC G4 design to achieve faster clock frequencies. New features included a fourth PCI slot, a 133 MHz system bus, an improved 4X AGP slot, and a new "digital audio" Tripath Class T amplifier sound system. The number of RAM slots was reduced to three, accommodating up to 1.5 Gigabytes of PC133 SDRAM.

The  model was the first Macintosh to include a built-in DVD-R or Apple-branded SuperDrive, the rest of the line became the first Macs to ship with CD-RW drives.

At Macworld Expo New York on July 18, 2001, a new line debuted featuring a cosmetically redesigned case known as Quicksilver, and various upgrades to the specifications. The  model was notable for not having a level three cache. The SuperDrive was offered on the mid-range  model, and UltraATA/100 hard drives were offered on all models. The internal speaker received an upgrade, using a Harman/Kardon speaker.

The Quicksilver line received criticism in MacWorlds review for removing the "eject" button and the manual eject pinhole, as well as the pass-through monitor power plug, and for the base specification of  RAM as being insufficient for running Mac OS X.

This was the first Mac to reach . Again, the low-end  model did not include any level three cache. The graphics in Updated Quicksilver machines were provided by an Nvidia GeForce4 Ti/MX or ATI Radeon 7500 graphics card. Some of these models have ATA controllers with 48-bit LBA to accommodate hard drives larger than 128 GB.

Digital Audio/Quicksilver model variations 
All are obsolete.

3rd generation: Mirrored Drive Doors/FireWire 800 

Another generation of Apple Power Mac G4s, officially named "Mirrored Drive Doors" (MDD), was introduced on August 13, 2002, featuring both a new Xserve-derived DDR motherboard architecture and a new case design. As with the Xserves, the PowerPC 7455 CPU used does not have a DDR frontside bus, meaning the CPU of the 133 MHz frontside bus models could use at most only 50% of the new system's theoretical memory bandwidth, providing no improvement over previous models. The rest was available to the graphics card and I/O systems. A single processor  model would be the last Power Mac G4 the company offered to the public after the announcement of the new Power Mac G5, introduced in June 2003.

The last real update to the Power Mac G4 line came on January 28, 2003, offering dual 1.42 GHz PowerPC 7455 processors, with features not seen in previous DDR models: a built-in FireWire 800 connector, optional integrated Bluetooth, and optional integrated AirPort Extreme. These were also the first Power Macs that could not boot into Mac OS 9.

With the launch of the Power Mac G5 on June 23, 2003, Apple re-introduced the August 2002 Power Mac G4 because of perceived demand for Mac OS 9 machines. Between that, its low price-tag, and the delayed availability of Power Mac G5s, it proved a strong seller, albeit for a relatively short time. Production stopped on June 27, 2004, and the remaining inventory was liquidated, its discontinuation ending the 20-year legacy of Classic Mac OS support.

Mirrored Drive Doors/FireWire 800 model variations 
All are obsolete.

Timeline

See also 

 Power Mac G4 Cube

Notes

References 

Macintosh towers
G4
G4